Khalid Izri (born Khalid Yachou in 1969) is a Moroccan artist singing in Riffian language. Izri songs are engaged songs about freedom and Tamazight. He has performed in different locations of the globe, including Europe and the USA.
Khalid Izri is not only a singer, but plays also a number of instruments such as guitar, flute and harmonica.

Albums
 Tamath inu - ⵜⴰⵎⴰⵝ ⵉⵏⵓ (my land)
 Izri inu - ⵉⵣⵔⵉ ⵉⵏⵓ (my song)
 Mayemmi - ⵎⴰⵢⴻⵎⵎⵉ (why)
 Taqessist - ⵜⴰⵇⴻⵙⵉⵙⵜ (The story)

References

1969 births
Living people
20th-century Moroccan male singers
21st-century Moroccan male singers